Bassel Fleihan (10 September 1963 – 18 April 2005) was a Lebanese legislator and minister of economy and trade. He died from injuries sustained when a massive bomb exploded on the Beirut seafront as he passed by in former Lebanese prime minister Rafik Hariri's motorcade on 14 February 2005.

Early years and education
Fleihan was born in Beirut on 10 September 1963. He attended International College. He received a bachelor of arts degree in economics from the American University of Beirut (AUB) in 1984. Then he obtained a master of arts degree in international and development economics from Yale University in 1985. He also held a PhD in economics from Columbia University in 1990. His PhD dissertation was entitled “Customs Unions, Growth and Economic Diversification”.

Career
From 1988 to 1993, Fleihan worked at the International Monetary Fund in Washington DC. He worked there as an advisor and then senior advisor to the Saudi executive director. He also worked at the United Nations Development Programme. In 1993, he left his job and returned to Lebanon, where he had been asked to assist in the post-war rehabilitation of the ministry of finance. While working as an adviser at the ministry, from 1993 to 1999, Fleihan also taught economics at his old alma mater, the American University of Beirut (AUB).

Fleihan was first elected to the Parliament of Lebanon in 2000, winning the Protestant seat in Beirut's first electoral district, and became the only Protestant member of the Parliament. He ran as a member of Hariri's "Dignity of Beirut" electoral list. In October 2000, he was appointed minister of economy and trade to the cabinet led by then prime minister Rafik Hariri. He held this position until 2003, and was replaced by Marwan Hamadeh.

Fleihan played a role in the development of Lebanon's economic reform program, which was presented by Hariri to international donors at a Paris conference in November 2002. Donors pledged $4.3 billion in soft loans; the plan was never fully implemented, but Lebanon did ultimately receive $2.39 billion from the donors.

Personal life
Fleihan was a Protestant and a member of the National Evangelical Church of Beirut. Fleihan is survived by his wife, Yasma Fleihan,  their children, Rayna (born 1999) and Rayan (born 2001), and his brother Ramsay and his family.

Death and funeral
The day before the Hariri assassination, Fleihan was in Geneva, Switzerland. Although his wife had tried to convince him to extend his stay in Europe, Fleihan insisted on returning to Lebanon for an extraordinary Parliamentary session scheduled for 14 February 2005. After the session, Fleihan joined Hariri in his motorcade to head back to the latter's mansion in West Beirut. About half-way through their journey, a one-ton truck bomb exploded as they passed through the city's upscale seafront hotel district. At least a dozen people—including Hariri and several of his bodyguards—were killed instantly; the final death toll rose to 21. A United Nations investigation of the incident by Detlev Mehlis, released in October 2005, pointed the finger at Syrian and Lebanese officials.

Despite being seated beside Hariri when the explosion occurred, Fleihan lived through the attack; however, severe burns covered over 95% of his body. Fleihan was firstly taken to the intensive care unit of the American University Hospital. Then he was airlifted to Percy Military Hospital in Clamart (suburb of Paris), where he survived for 64 days before finally succumbing to his injuries. He died on 18 April 2005.

Fleihan's body was taken to Lebanon and funeral service was held at a Protestant church in Beirut. His body was buried in Tohwita, suburb of Beirut, on 22 April.

Institute des Finances Basil Fuleihan

Overview 
Located at Lebanese Ministry of Finance, Institute des Finances Basil Fuleihan, is a knowledge research center. It specialized in public financial management and governance through policy research, training and partnership building. 

The center's primary goals aim at: 

 Building financial literacy of youth 
 Facilitating access to information 
 Operating as a public library
Also, it is the  a platform for regional cooperation hosting the secretariat of the GIFT-MENA network of civil service training schools. Adding to this it, hosts the regional training center of the World Customs Organization (WCO).

Background History 
It was founded in 1996 in cooperation with the Government of France. In 2006, it was renamed Institut des Finances Basil Fuleihan in honor of the late Minister of Economy.

Publications (2020) 
Institute des Finances Basil Fuleihan has many publications but only most recent ones were shared.

Legacy
His family established Basil Fuleihan Foundation in Lebanon after his death. The aim of the foundation is stated to be the provision of the basis for tomorrow’s Lebanon by promoting improvements in public policy and public service. In February 2006, the finance institute at Lebanese finance ministry was named the "Bassel Fleihan finance and economy institute", which Fleihan actively contributed its foundation in 1996.

See also
 List of assassinated Lebanese politicians

References

External links
Praying for Basil

1963 births
2005 deaths
American University of Beirut alumni
Academic staff of the American University of Beirut
Assassinated Lebanese politicians
Columbia Graduate School of Arts and Sciences alumni
Government ministers of Lebanon
Lebanese terrorism victims
Members of the Parliament of Lebanon
Politicians from Beirut
Terrorism deaths in Lebanon
Yale Graduate School of Arts and Sciences alumni